The 2013–14 Eurocup Basketball season was the 12th edition of Europe's second-tier level transnational competition for men's professional basketball clubs, the EuroCup. The EuroCup is the European-wide league level that is one level below the EuroLeague. Valencia, the winner of this competition, earned a place at the group stage of the next season's EuroLeague. Valencia beat UNICS in two legs. It was the first time since the 2002–03 season, that the Finals were played over two games.

Competition format changes
The competition increases from 32 to 48 teams in the Regular Season phase. The size of the groups will grow to six teams, where the first three qualified teams will join the Last 32 stage. Another innovation this season will see clubs divided into two regional conferences for the Regular Season phase.

Euroleague clubs that do not qualify for the Euroleague Top 16 will join the remaining 24 Eurocup teams for the Last 32 phase.

Teams
48 teams will participate in Eurocup Regular Season. 41 of them will qualify directly to this stage with the seven losers of the Euroleague Qualifying Rounds. For the Last 32, eight teams who didn't make the Top 16 in the 2013–14 Euroleague would enter.

Draw
The draws for the 2013–14 Eurocup were held on Saturday, 5 October, after the Euroleague Qualifying Rounds were played.

Teams were divided into two geographical conferences with 24 teams and 4 groups each.
For the each conference teams were seeded into six pots of four teams in accordance with the Club Ranking, based on their performance in European competitions during a three-year period.

Two teams from the same country could not be drawn together in the same Regular Season group if possible. Liga ABA teams (Serbia, Croatia, Slovenia, Montenegro, Macedonia and Bosnia and Herzegovina) are considered as same country teams.

Western Conference

Eastern Conference

Regular season

The Regular Season began on Tuesday, October 15.

If teams were level on record at the end of the Regular Season, tiebreakers were applied in the following order:
 Head-to-head record.
 Head-to-head point differential.
 Point differential during the Regular Season.
 Points scored during the regular season.
 Sum of quotients of points scored and points allowed in each Regular Season match.

Western Conference

Group A

Group B

Group C

Group D

Eastern Conference

Group E

Group F

Group G

Group H

Last 32 phase
The Last 32 runs from January 7 to February 19, 2014

If teams were level on record at the end of the Last 32 phase, tiebreakers were applied in the following order:
 Head-to-head record.
 Head-to-head point differential.
 Point differential during the Last 32 phase.
 Points scored during the Last 32 phase.
 Sum of quotients of points scored and points allowed in each Last 32 phase match.

Group I

Group J

Group K

Group L

Group M

Group N

Group O

Group P

Knockout phase

In the knockout phase rounds will be played in a home-and-away format, with the overall cumulative score determining the winner of a round. Thus, the score of one single game can be tied.

The team that finished in the higher Last 32 place will play the second game of the series at home.
If both teams placed the same in the Last 32, the team with more Last 32 victories will play the second game at home.
In case of a tie in both place and victories, the team with the higher cumulative Last 32 point difference will play the second game at home.

Bracket

Finals

Game 1

Game 2

Individual statistics

Rating

Points

Rebounds

Assists

Awards

MVP Weekly

Regular season

Last 32

Eighthfinals

Quarterfinals

Semifinals

Finals

Eurocup MVP
  Andrew Goudelock (UNICS)

Eurocup Finals MVP
  Justin Doellman (Valencia BC)

All-Eurocup Teams

Coach of the Year
 Andrea Trinchieri (UNICS)

Rising Star
 Bojan Dubljević (Valencia Basket)

See also
 2013–14 Euroleague
 2013–14 EuroChallenge

References

 
Euro
EuroCup Basketball seasons